The 2011 Russian Professional Rugby League season will be the seventh edition of the competition since its transition from the Super League.

The reigning champions, VVA Monino will be attempting to secure a recording breaking ninth championship and overtake Krasny Yar as the most successful Russian rugby union side in the professional era.

There have again been a number of changes and events taking place behind the scenes at the Russian Rugby Union.  At the start of the season, rumours spread that the league would again expand, possibly to as many as fifteen (15) teams.  Of the potential new entrants, the most likely entrant was a team based in the city of Kazan, a former "stronghold" of rugby league in Russia.

However, due to the commitments of the national team at the World Cup, it was decided that there would be no new teams added to the competition.  To compensate, a lower division was created, called the First Division, wherein seven teams will compete for the chance to be promoted to the "Super League".

Competition format
Details of this season's competition format have not yet been decided.

Teams
VVA-Podmoskovye Monino, from Monino, Moscow Oblast.
Yenisy-STM Krasnoyarsk, from Krasnoyarsk, Krasnoyarsk Oblast.
Krasny Yar Krasnoyarsk, from Krasnoyarsk, Krasnoyarsk Oblast.
Slava Moscow, from Moscow, Moscow Oblast.
Imperia-Dynamo Penza, from Penza.
RC Novokuznetsk, from Novokuznesk
Fili Moscow, from Moscow, Moscow Oblast.
Spartak Moscow, from Moscow, Moscow Oblast.

Warm-up fixtures and results

Table

Schedule and results

References

External links
Official website 
Information rugby portal 
Russian rugby statistics 
Heavensgame  
 

2011
2011 in Russian rugby union
2011 rugby union tournaments for clubs
2010–11 in European rugby union leagues
2011–12 in European rugby union leagues

ru:Чемпионат России по регби 2010